Ian Anderson (23 June 1925 – 13 August 1977) was a New Zealand cricketer. He played in one first-class match for Canterbury in 1964/65.

See also
 List of Canterbury representative cricketers

References

External links
 

1925 births
1977 deaths
New Zealand cricketers
Canterbury cricketers
Cricketers from Christchurch